Shiloh Church is a historic church at Huntsville and Main Streets in Springdale, Arkansas.  It is a two-story wood-frame structure, finished with wooden clapboards and topped by a gable roof with a small belfry.  Decoration is relatively plain, with pilastered corners, a plain entablature along the side walls, and transom windows above the pair of entrances on the main facade.  Built in 1870, it is the oldest surviving building in Springdale.  It was used for many years as both a church (by multiple denominations) and the local Masonic lodge.  By the late 1920s it had been abandoned by all of these users, and was acquired in 1932 by the local chapter of the International Order of Odd Fellows (IOOF), which used it as its lodge.  The IOOF chapter deeded the building to the city in 2005.

The church was listed on the National Register of Historic Places in 1975.

See also
National Register of Historic Places listings in Washington County, Arkansas

References

Churches on the National Register of Historic Places in Arkansas
Greek Revival church buildings in Arkansas
Churches completed in 1870
Churches in Washington County, Arkansas
Former Masonic buildings in Arkansas
Odd Fellows buildings in Arkansas
Wooden churches in Arkansas
National Register of Historic Places in Washington County, Arkansas
Historic district contributing properties in Arkansas
Buildings and structures in Springdale, Arkansas
1870 establishments in Arkansas
Individually listed contributing properties to historic districts on the National Register in Arkansas